Warwick Valley High School (WVHS) is located on Sanfordville Road outside the Village of Warwick, New York, United States. It educates students in grades 9 through 12 in the Warwick Valley Central School District, which covers most of the village and town of Warwick, including the hamlet of Pine Island. Students in those portions of the town near the village of Florida and the village of Greenwood Lake attend other high schools. A referendum to send students from the latter community to WVHS failed in 2007.

References

External links
School website

Schools in Orange County, New York
Public high schools in New York (state)
Warwick, New York